Katerin Fabiola Castro Muñoz (born 21 November 1991) is a Colombian footballer who played as a forward for the Colombia women's national football team. She was part of the team at the 2011 FIFA Women's World Cup. At the club level, she played for Club Deportivo Estudiantes F.C. in Colombia.

References

External links
 

1991 births
Living people
Women's association football forwards
Colombian women's footballers
Place of birth missing (living people)
Colombia women's international footballers
2011 FIFA Women's World Cup players
Pan American Games competitors for Colombia
Footballers at the 2011 Pan American Games
21st-century Colombian women